Nélida Fullone (born 27 January 1915, date of death unknown) was an Argentine fencer. She competed in the women's individual foil event at the 1948 Summer Olympics.

References

1915 births
Year of death missing
Argentine female foil fencers
Olympic fencers of Argentina
Fencers at the 1948 Summer Olympics